David Tecchler, sometimes also written Techler, Tekler, Deckler, Dechler, Decler, Teccler or Teckler, (1666–1748) was a German luthier, best known for his cellos and double basses.

Early life
Tecchler was born in Augsburg and moved  to Rome while he was still quite young and established himself there.

Construction
Tecchler's instruments are Germanic or Italian in their style of construction.

History
Possibly the most famous Tecchler cello known today is the "ex Roser" of Rome 1723, currently being played by soloist Robert Cohen. The scroll of the "ex Roser" is a sculpted portrait of its commissioner, David Tecchler's employer in Rome, who resided in the Vatican.

A 1706 Tecchler cello was acquired by the Canada Council for the Arts Musical Instrument Bank and is on loan to the Canadian cellist Denis Brott.

Other musicians who own or play Tecchler instruments include Anne Martindale Williams, principal cellist of the Pittsburgh Symphony Orchestra, who plays a Tecchler cello made in Rome in 1701;, Casals disciples Marie Roemaet Rosanoff, and later Lief Rosanoff played a 1704 Tecchler cello that is currently for sale at Tarisio.com.  The young Turkish cellist Benyamin Sönmez (+2011), who played a cello made in Rome in 1723;  Martha Babcock, Assistant Principal cello at the Boston Symphony Orchestra and Principal cello for the Boston Pops owns a Tecchler known as the "ex-Feuermann", made in Rome in 1741; the Israeli cellist Yehuda Hanani performs on a 1730 Tecchler of particular beauty, tonally and visually, previously in the possession of the Von Mendelssohn family; Stephen Lansberry, a former UK music professor, now living in France, owned, for forty years, an instrument made in 1727; Marcy Rosen, soloist and member of the Mendelssohn String Quartet, plays an exceptionally beautiful Tecchler cello dated 1720. Her cello, owned by the famous Francais family of Luthiers for three generations, was shown in Jacques Francais's Lincoln Center Stainer exhibition in the 1980s.

Steven Doane, Professor of Cello at the Eastman School of Music in Rochester, USA, plays a David Tecchler cello dated 1720. Professor Anthony Elliott at the University of Michigan owns a particularly beautiful Tecchler once owned by the Duke of Edinburgh.

Latvian Soloist Maxim Beitan plays a David Tecchler Cello dated 1698.

Ray Shows, founding member of the Artaria String Quartet (Boston 1986), professor at St. Olaf College and 2004 prizewinner of a McKnight Fellowship plays a violin by David Tecchler from 1726.

Swedish cellist Kristina Winiarski plays a David Tecchler Cello dated 1711 (formerly played by Lynn Harrell and Torleif Thedéen). It is owned by the Royal Swedish Music Academy's instrument foundation

The Metropolitan Museum of Art is home to an Archlute by David Tecchler from around the year 1725.

On 22 October 2019, musician Stephen Morris had been on the London to Orpington service, and got out at Penge East with his bike, but forgot his antique David Tecchler violin, worth £250,000. He was reunited with the violin on 1 November

See also
Stradivarius

References 
 http://www.pittsburghsymphony.org/pghsymph.nsf/bios/Anne+Martindale+Williams

1666 births
1748 deaths
German luthiers
Businesspeople from Rome
Austrian male musicians